Harry's Practice was an Australian lifestyle television program that was broadcast on the Seven Network between 2 December 1997 and 2003. In New Zealand, the show was broadcast on TV ONE.

The show was hosted by veterinarian Harry Cooper, who provided advice for pet care. The show also featured Katrina Warren and Chris Brown as presenters. Cooper currently is involved with Better Homes and Gardens, a television program, in which he performs similar show segments as to that previously seen on Harry's Practice.

See also 
 List of Seven Network programs
 List of Australian television series

References

Australian non-fiction television series
Seven Network original programming
1997 Australian television series debuts
2003 Australian television series endings
Television shows set in Tasmania